The Archdeacon of Rochester is a senior office-holder in the Diocese of Rochester (a division of the Church of England Province of Canterbury.) Like other archdeacons, they are administrators in the diocese at large (having oversight of parishes in roughly one-third of the diocese). The present incumbent is the Venerable Andy Wooding Jones.

History
The first Archdeacon of Rochester is recorded , at approximately the same sort of time as archdeacons were being appointed across the country. At this point, this archdeacon was the sole archdeacon in the diocese, functioning as an assistant to the bishop. The archidiaconal and diocesan boundaries remained similar for almost 750 years until 1 January 1846 when the three archdeaconries of Colchester, Essex and St Albans from the Diocese of London were added to the diocese while all of west Kent but the Deanery of Rochester was given to the Diocese of Canterbury – at this point, the diocese covered all of Essex. The archdeaconry of Rochester, having been reduced severely, was first suppressed at the next vacancy (Walter King's death in 1859) then held by the Archdeacon of St Albans. The archdeaconry was then given to Canon Cheetham, a residentiary canon of Rochester Cathedral and the bishop's examining chaplain, who held it until after the Kentish territory was returned.

Those three archdeaconries created the new Diocese of St Albans in 1877, but the diocese received part of Surrey (which part was constituted into the Southwark archdeaconry the next year) a few months later: in 1879 the Kingston archdeaconry was split off from Southwark; those two archdeaconries were erected into the Diocese of Southwark in 1905 while west Kent was returned to the Rochester diocese – immediately prior to that date the Diocese of Rochester covered a large portion of Surrey (now southern Greater London) immediately south of the Thames. Once again, Rochester was the sole archdeaconry of the diocese until it was split to create the Archdeaconry of Tonbridge in 1906; it was further split in 1955 to create the Archdeaconry of Bromley, so that there are today three archdeaconries in the present diocese, covering West Kent plus the two London boroughs of Bromley and Bexley – an area broadly similar to that covered until 1846.

List of archdeacons

High Medieval
bef. 1107–aft. 1107: Ansketil
bef. 1122–aft. 1115: Hervey or Herwis
bef. 1134–bef. 1145 (res.): Robert Pullen (became cardinal-priest of San Martino ai Monti)
bef. 1145–aft. 1190: Paris
bef. 1193–aft. 1225: William son of Peter
bef. 1238–aft. 1245: a vicar of Frindsbury
bef. 1253–1274 (d.): William de Sancto Martino
bef. 1278–1288 (d.): John de Sancto Dionysio
bef. 1289–9 February 1321 (deprived): Roger de Weseham

Late Medieval
1321–bef. 1323 (res.): Pierre Cardinal Desprès (Cardinal-priest of Santa Pudenziana)
1323–bef. 1359 (res.): William de le Dene
20 June 1359–bef. 1364 (res.): William Reade
1364–aft. 1366: William Wyvel of Wenlock
bef. 1368–aft. 1368: Roger
?–bef. 1373 (res.): William de Navesby
1373–bef. 1396 (d.): Roger de Denford
31 July 1396 – 1400 (d.): Thomas Halle
bef. 1402–aft. 1402: William Hunden
bef. 1418–1418 (d.): William Purcell
1420–bef. 1452 (d.): Richard Cordon or Brouns
21 November 1452–aft. 1467: John Lowe
bef. 1474–aft. 1475: Roger Rotherham
bef. 1480–1489 (d.): Henry Sharp
bef. 1497–bef. 1512 (res.): Henry Edyall
26 November 1512–bef. 1537 (res.): Nicholas Metcalfe
27 August 1537 – 1554 (res.): Maurice Griffith (became Bishop of Rochester)

Early modern
20 July 1554–bef. 1560 (res.): John Kennall
3 February 1560–bef. 1571 (res.): John Bridgewater
10 July 1571–bef. 1576 (d.): John Calverley
5 July 1576–bef. 1593 (res.): Ralph Pickover (became Archdeacon of Salisbury)
2 July 1593 – 1606 (d.): Thomas Staller
13 August 1606–bef. 1614 (d.): Thomas Sanderson
9 April 1614 – 1624 (d.): Richard Tillesley
20 April 1625–bef. 1652 (d.): Elizeus Burgess
1660–12 June 1679 (d.): John Lee
21 June 1679 – 20 November 1704 (d.): Thomas Plume
4 December 1704 – 10 May 1720 (d.): Thomas Sprat
24 May 1720 – 10 May 1728 (d.): the Hon Henry Bridges
23 June–15 July 1728 (d.): William Bradford
22 July 1728 – 5 August 1767 (d.): John Denne
3 September 1767 – 5 February 1827 (d.): John Law
6 July 1827 – 13 March 1859 (d.): Walker King

Late modern
1859–1863: archdeaconry suppressed (from King's death) by Order in Council, 8 August 1845
1863–1882 (res.): Anthony Grant, Archdeacon of St Albans
1882–9 July 1908 (d.): Samuel Cheetham (previously Archdeacon of Southwark)
1908–29 April 1915 (d.): Tetley Rowe
1915–24 September 1932 (d.): Donald Tait (also Vice-Dean of Rochester from 1924)
1933–1951 (ret.): Walter Browne (afterwards archdeacon emeritus)
1951–1969 (ret.): Lawrence Harland (afterwards archdeacon emeritus)
1969–1976 (ret.): David Stewart-Smith
1977–1983 (res.): Derek Palmer
1984–1988 (res.): Michael Turnbull (became Bishop of Rochester)
1989–2000 (res.): Norman Warren
2001–2009 (ret.): Peter Lock
24 January 20103 July 2018 (res.): Simon Burton-Jones (became Bishop of Tonbridge)
11 September 2018present: Andy Wooding Jones

References

Sources

 
Diocese of Rochester
Lists of Anglicans
Archdeacon of Rochester